Demi is a feminine given name with Greek and Latin roots, and it is a surname with Albanian origins. Demi was originally a nickname of Demetria, the feminine form of the masculine name Demetrius, which is itself the Latin and English spelling of the Greek name Demetrios. People named Demi include:

Given name
 Demi (artist) (born 1955), Cuban-born American contemporary painter
 Demi (author), nickname of Charlotte Dumaresq Hunt, American children's book author (born 1942)
 Demi de Jong (born 1995), Dutch road cyclist
 Demi Evans (born 1960s), American singer
 Demi Getschko (born 1954), Brazilian computer scientist
 Demi Lovato (born 1992), American singer, songwriter and actor
 Demi Moore (born 1962), American actress
 Demi Orimoloye (born 1997), Canadian baseball player
 Demi Isaac Oviawe (born 2000), Nigerian-born Irish actress
 Demi Schuurs (born 1993), Dutch tennis player
 Demi Stokes (born 1991), English footballer
 Demi Vance (born 1991), Northern Irish footballer
 Demi Vermeulen (born 1995), Dutch Paralympic equestrian
 Demi-Leigh Tebow (born 1995), South African beauty pageants titleholder and Miss Universe 2017
 Demi Rose (born 1995), English social media celebrity
 Demi Vollering (born 1996), Dutch road cyclist

Surname
 Ali Demi, Albanian hero of the WWII
 Leonard Demi, Albanian politician elected in 2009
 Musa Demi (1878–1971), Albanian revolutionary and writer
 Niazi Demi (1919–1977), Albanian politician
 Tahir Demi (1919–1961), Albanian politician

Other
 Demi Bennett, a ring name of Rhea Ripley (born 1996), Australian pro wrestler
 Demi Bourbon, a survivor in the video game Identity V
 Demi Delia, a stage name of Gina Rodriguez (pornographic actress) (born 1967)

See also
 Demy (surname)

English feminine given names
English given names
Feminine given names
Albanian-language surnames